The Aikanã are an indigenous people of Brazil, living in the state of Rondônia, in the western Amazonian lowlands. They are also known as the Cassupá, Massaca, Columbiara, Huari, Mundé, and Tubarão.

Land
The Aikanã's traditional lands are in the region of the Guaporé River. In 1970, the Brazilian government moved the tribe onto the Tubarão-Latundê Indigenous Territory, with poor soil. They have three villages and live in nearby cities, such as Vilhena.

Language
Aikanã people speak the Aikanã language, which is an unclassified language. Its ISO 639-3 language code is "tba".

Notes

Ethnic groups in Brazil
Indigenous peoples in Brazil
Indigenous peoples of the Amazon